The Southern California Jewish Sports Hall of Fame, in Beverly Hills, California, is a hall of fame dedicated to honoring American Jewish athletes, other sports personalities, and teams from Southern California who have distinguished themselves in sports.

History

The Hall of Fame was established in 1990 by a group of men and women organized by former All-America basketball player Eli Sherman. It is located in Bel Air, California, at the American Jewish University.  It honors Southern California Jewish athletes, coaches, officials, media, executives, and others at both professional and non-professional levels. It also supports the Maccabiah Games in Israel, JCC Maccabi Games, and the Allan Malamud Memorial Scholarship Fund.

It has honored over 300 Jewish men, women, and teams. Inductees have included swimmers Mark Spitz and Lenny Krayzelburg, baseball Hall of Famer Sandy Koufax, all-around athlete Lillian Copeland, water polo player Merrill Moses, tennis players Brian Teacher and Stacy Margolin, and football coach Sid Gillman.

In 2010, the Hall of Fame inducted among others Milwaukee Brewers All Star left fielder Ryan Braun and Los Angeles Lakers guard Jordan Farmar, as well as Benny Feilhaber (soccer), Jillian Kraus (water polo), Joel Meyers (media), and Aaron Rosenberg (football).

In 2011, high school baseball player Max Fried was honored by the Hall of Fame, and football player Taylor Mays was inducted into the Hall.

In 2013, it inducted among others national handball champion Paul Haber, 1985 U.S. figure skating champion Judy Blumberg, 1950s tennis player Anita Kanter, Miami Marlins president Larry Beinfest, football and track athlete Mel Bleeker, surfer Shaun Tomson, and former Houston Astros and Atlanta Braves outfielder Norm Miller.

In 2015 volleyball player Alix Klineman was among those inducted into the Hall of Fame, and football quarterback Josh Rosen was named high school male athlete of the year.

In 2016, it inducted among others Andrew Lorraine (baseball), Andy Hill (basketball), brothers Mitchell Schwartz and Geoffrey Schwartz as well as Erik Affholter (football),  Stanley Tarshis (gymnastics), Marc Stein (media), Ramona Shelburne (softball), and Andi Murez (swimming).

In 2020, the Hall of Fame inducted Steven Birnbaum (soccer), Cody Decker, Ryan Lavarnway, and Joc Pederson (baseball), Chelsey Goldberg (ice hockey), and Soren Thompson (fencing).

Hall of Fame

See also
List of Jews in sports
Jewish Sports Review
National Jewish Museum Sports Hall of Fame (U.S.)
International Jewish Sports Hall of Fame

References

External links
"Southern California Jewish Sports Hall of Fame 30th Anniversary Documentary," January 23, 2020.

Jewish-American sports history

Lists of Jews
Jewish sports organizations
Jewish museums in California
Sports museums in California
1990 establishments in California
Jewish
Awards established in 1990
Jews and Judaism in California
California sports-related lists
Museums in Los Angeles
Bel Air, Los Angeles
Jewish
Lists of American sportspeople
Organizations based in Los Angeles County, California